Noble County is a county located in the U.S. state of Ohio. As of the 2020 census, the population was 14,115, making it the fourth-least populous county in Ohio. Its county seat is Caldwell. The county is named for Rep. Warren P. Noble of the Ohio House of Representatives, who was an early settler there.

History
Noble County was formed on March 11, 1851, from portions of Guernsey, Morgan, Monroe and Washington counties.  It was the last and youngest county to be formed in the state. It was named for either James Noble or Warren P. Noble, each of whom was an early settler in this region.

Noble County was home to the first North American oil well, the Thorla-McKee Well, which struck oil in 1814. For a time this was a center of oil production in the state.

In 1925, a United States Navy dirigible, USS Shenandoah (ZR-1), was caught in a storm over Noble County. It broke into several pieces, resulting in the deaths of 14 persons on board; 29 survived.

Geography

Adjacent counties
 Guernsey County (north)
 Belmont County (northeast)
 Monroe County (east)
 Washington County (south)
 Morgan County (west)
 Muskingum County (northwest)

National protected area
 Wayne National Forest (part)

Demographics

2000 census
As of the census of 2000, there were 14,058 people, 4,546 households, and 3,318 families living in the county. The population density was 35 people per square mile (14/km2). There were 5,480 housing units at an average density of 14 per square mile (5/km2). The racial makeup of the county was 92.55% White, 6.69% Black or African American, 0.26% Native American, 0.09% Asian, 0.03% from other races, and 0.38% from two or more races. 0.43% of the population were Hispanic or Latino of any race.

There were 4,546 households, out of which 33.50% had children under the age of 18 living with them, 61.50% were married couples living together, 7.70% had a female householder with no husband present, and 27.00% were non-families. 24.30% of all households were made up of individuals, and 12.60% had someone living alone who was 65 years of age or older. The average household size was 2.61 and the average family size was 3.10.

In the county, the population was spread out, with 22.60% under the age of 18, 11.70% from 18 to 24, 31.80% from 25 to 44, 20.80% from 45 to 64, and 13.10% who were 65 years of age or older. The median age was 36 years. For every 100 females there were 130.80 males. For every 100 females age 18 and over, there were 140.50 males.

The median income for a household in the county was $32,940, and the median income for a family was $38,939. Males had a median income of $30,911 versus $20,222 for females. The per capita income for the county was $14,100. About 8.30% of families and 11.40% of the population were below the poverty line, including 13.90% of those under age 18 and 11.90% of those age 65 or over.

2010 census
As of the 2010 United States census, there were 14,645 people, 4,852 households, and 3,394 families living in the county. The racial makeup of the county was 96.1% white, 2.5% black or African American, 0.3% American Indian, 0.1% Asian, 0.2% from other races, and 0.8% from two or more races. Those of Hispanic or Latino origin made up 0.4% of the population. In terms of ancestry, 25.9% were German, 13.1% were Irish, 9.1% were American, and 9.0% were English.

Of the 4,852 households, 30.4% had children under the age of 18 living with them, 55.8% were married couples living together, 8.6% had a female householder with no husband present, 30.0% were non-families, and 25.7% of all households were made up of individuals. The average household size was 2.47 and the average family size was 2.94. The median age was 48.6 years.

The median income for a household in the county was $39,500 and the median income for a family was $44,773. Males had a median income of $42,456 versus $29,551 for females. The per capita income for the county was $20,029. About 11.6% of families and 14.9% of the population were below the poverty line, including 22.9% of those under age 18 and 13.8% of those age 65 or over.

Politics

Noble County is a Republican stronghold in presidential elections, although Bill Clinton narrowly won it in 1996.

|}

Government
Noble County has a three-member Board of County Commissioners that oversee and administer the various County departments, similar to all but two of the 88 Ohio counties. Noble County's elected commissioners are:
 County Commissioners: Virgil Thompson (R), Brad Peoples (R), and Ty Moore (R).

Education
Noble County is served by the Caldwell Exempted Village School District and Noble Local School District.

Communities

Villages
 Batesville
 Belle Valley
 Caldwell (county seat)
 Dexter City
 Sarahsville
 Summerfield

Townships

 Beaver
 Brookfield
 Buffalo
 Center
 Elk
 Enoch
 Jackson
 Jefferson
 Marion
 Noble
 Olive
 Seneca
 Sharon
 Stock
 Wayne

https://web.archive.org/web/20160715023447/http://www.ohiotownships.org/township-websites

Unincorporated communities
 Ava
 Carlisle
 Crooked Tree
 Dudley
 Dungannon
 East Union
 Elk
 Fulda
 Gem
 Harriettsville
 Hiramsburg
 Honesty
 Hoskinsville
 Keith
 Kennonsburg
 Middleburg
 Moundsville
 Mount Ephraim
 Olive Green
 Rochester
 Sharon
 South Olive
 Steamtown
 Whigville

See also
 National Register of Historic Places listings in Noble County, Ohio

Footnotes

Further reading
 Thomas William Lewis, History of Southeastern Ohio and the Muskingum Valley, 1788-1928. In Three Volumes. Chicago: S.J. Clarke Publishing Co., 1928.

External links
 Unofficial county information website 
 Noble County Sheriff's Office

 
Appalachian Ohio
Counties of Appalachia
1851 establishments in Ohio
Populated places established in 1851